The 1969 Syracuse Orangemen football team represented Syracuse University during the 1969 NCAA University Division football season. The team was led by 21st-year head coach Ben Schwartzwalder and played their home games at Archbold Stadium in Syracuse, New York. Syracuse ended the season with a record of 5–5 and were not invited to a bowl game.

Schedule

Roster

References

Syracuse
Syracuse Orange football seasons
Syracuse Orangemen football